The avian family Thamnophilidae is usually called the typical antbirds. The International Ornithological Committee (IOC) recognizes these 238 species distributed among 63 genera in the family, 24 of which have only one species. Confusingly, only 96 of the species are called "antbirds"; the others are variously named antwren, antshrike, antvireo, bushbird, bare-eye, fire-eye, and stipplethroat.

This list is presented according to the IOC taxonomic sequence and can also be sorted alphabetically by common name and binomial.

List

References

Antbird